Limnogonus franciscanus is a species of water strider in the family Gerridae. It is found from southern Florida and southern Texas in the United States south throughout the Caribbean, Mexico, Central America, and into South America.

References

Articles created by Qbugbot
Insects described in 1859
Gerrini